Hussein Ammouta (also spelled Lhoussaine Ammouta – born 24 October 1969 in Khemisset) is a Moroccan professional football manager and former player, who is the current head coach of Botola side Wydad AC. He previously played as a midfielder, and had spent his entire playing career in the Middle East and Africa. He competed in the 1992 Summer Olympics.

Playing career
His career began in his hometown club of Ittihad Khemisset in 1988. He joined Al Sadd in 1997, helping them win the Emir Cup and the Crown Prince Cup in his second season at Jassim Bin Hamad Stadium. He was the league top goalscorer that season.

He had spells in United Arab Emirates with Al Sharjah and in Saudi Arabia with Al Riyadh.

Managerial career
He began his managerial career as a player-coach at Zemmouis SC in 2003.

In 2007, he returned to his first club, Ittihad Khemisset, winning the league. He left in the 2007-08 season, and from 2008 to 2011, he took over the reins of a well-known club, FUS de Rabat. After he left, he joined Al Sadd as the technical director, before being named as a replacement for head coach Jorge Fossati in 2012.

His skills would be tested for the 2012 Sheikh Jassem Cup where they played most of their matches with their second team, and were in the final defeated by Al Rayyan SC, 1-0. Talk in the league, even amongst pundits, praised the team's form having consecutively won the set of nine matches that began the season, setting a league record. Sadd were eventually held to a goalless draw by Al Kharaitiyat on 8 December 2012. Al-Sadd won the league on 13 April 2013, one match before the end of the league. The victory followed a hiatus since the Al-Sadd league victory in 2007.

Return to Wydad AC 
On 18 August 2022, Ammouta was announced as the new Wydad AC head coach, replacing Walid Regragui.

Career statistics

Managerial

Honours

Player
Al-Sadd
Qatar Stars League: 1999–00
Emir of Qatar Cup: 1999–00, 2000–01
Crown Prince Cup: 1998
Sheikh Jassim Cup: 1998, 2000

Manager
Fath Union Sport
Moroccan Throne Cup: 2010
CAF Confederation Cup: 2010

Al-Sadd
Qatar Stars League: 2012–13
Emir of Qatar Cup: 2014, 2015
Sheikh Jassem Cup: 2014

Wydad AC
CAF Champions League: 2017
Botola: 2016–17

Morocco
African Nations Championship: 2020

Individual
Qatar Stars Leaguejoint -Top Goalscorer: 1997–98 10 goals 15 games
Qatar Emir Cup Top Goalscorer: Qatar Emir Cup 2001 7 goals 7 games
Qatar Stars League Manager of the Season: 2012–13
Qatar Stars League Manager of the Month: October 2014
Qatar Stars League Manager of the Month: April 2015
Botola Manager of the Season: 2016–17

References

1969 births
Living people
Expatriate football managers in Qatar
Al Sadd SC managers
Moroccan football managers
Wydad AC managers
People from Khemisset
Ittihad Khemisset managers
Olympic footballers of Morocco
Footballers at the 1992 Summer Olympics
Association football midfielders
Ittihad Khemisset players
Fath Union Sport players
Al-Riyadh SC players
Al Sadd SC players
Sharjah FC players
Qatar SC players
Botola players
Saudi Professional League players
Qatar Stars League players
UAE Pro League players
Expatriate footballers in Saudi Arabia
Expatriate footballers in Qatar
Expatriate footballers in the United Arab Emirates
Moroccan expatriate sportspeople in Saudi Arabia
Moroccan expatriate sportspeople in Qatar
Moroccan expatriate sportspeople in the United Arab Emirates
Moroccan footballers
Morocco international footballers
Mediterranean Games bronze medalists for Morocco
Mediterranean Games medalists in football
Competitors at the 1991 Mediterranean Games
Botola managers